St Andrew St John, 15th Baron St John of Bletso (8 November 1811 – 27 January 1874) was an English peer.

Biography
St John was born at Wimpole Street the eldest son of St Andrew St John, 14th Baron St John of Bletso, and his wife, Louisa Boughton, daughter of Sir Charles William Rouse-Boughton, 9th Baronet. He succeeded his father in 1817 to become the 15th Lord St John at the age of six. He was educated at Harrow School and was admitted at Trinity College, Cambridge on 10 March 1829. He lived at Melchbourne Park and politically was a Tory, unlike his father.

St John married Eleanor Hussey, daughter of Vice-Admiral Sir Richard Hussey Hussey on 12 March 1838. In addition to his sons St Andrew and Beauchamp, who succeeded successively to the barony, he had a third son, Edmund, and two daughters, Eleanor and Laura (12 June 1842 – 21 October 1919), who married Connolly McCausland of Drenagh (13 May 1828 – 25 June 1902) on 8 June 1867, and were the great-great grandparents of comedian, actor and TV presenter Alexander Armstrong.

St John died aged 62 at Melchbourne, and was buried at Bletsoe. He was succeeded in the title successively by his sons St Andrew and Beauchamp.

References

1811 births
1874 deaths
St Andrew
People educated at Harrow School
Alumni of Trinity College, Cambridge
Barons St John of Bletso